The SL C1 was the first series of subway train used in the Stockholm metro from 1950 until 1983. C1's were manufactured in 20 sets between 1949 and 1950, the first set being delivered to Stockholm on 2 June 1949. Wagon 2003 was rebuilt to C2 in 1956, and wagons 2001 and 2002 were rebuilt to said model in 1965. Wagon 2009 was taken out of service in 1978, wagons 2004-2008 between 1980 and 1983 and wagons 2010–2020 in 1983.

References

Stockholm metro